Ahmed Al-Hatmi (born September 27, 1984 in Rustaq, Oman) is an Omani Double trap shooter. He competed at the 2012 Summer Olympics. He was the flag bearer of Oman at the 2012 Summer Olympics.

References

External links
 

1984 births
Living people
Omani male sport shooters
Shooters at the 2012 Summer Olympics
Olympic shooters of Oman
Trap and double trap shooters
People from Al-Rustaq
21st-century Omani people